PP-30 Gujrat-III is a Constituency of Provincial Assembly of Punjab. It comprises Dinga, Karnana, Pakistan and many villages.

General elections 2013

General elections 2008

See also
 PP-29 Gujrat-II
 PP-31 Gujrat-IV

References

External links
 Election commission Pakistan's official website
 Awazoday.com check result
 Official Website of Government of Punjab

Constituencies of Punjab, Pakistan